Mass and Cass, also known as Methadone Mile or Recovery Road, is a tent city located at and around the intersection of Melnea Cass Boulevard and Massachusetts Avenue in Boston, Massachusetts. It has been characterized as "the epicenter of the region's opioid addiction crisis."

Mass and Cass is located in Newmarket, an industrial area of Boston that includes parts of Dorchester, South Boston, Roxbury, and the South End.

Due to its concentration of service providers, the area around Mass and Cass has attracted a large number of people struggling with homelessness and drug addiction, especially after the closure of facilities on Long Island, in the Boston Harbor Islands.

Aftermath of Long Island closure

History of Long Island services 
Up until its 2014 closure, homeless people had been sheltered at Long Island since 1928, and had received substance use treatment there since 1941. Long Island was home to Boston's largest homeless shelter, the Long Island shelter, housing 450 beds, as well as Boston's largest detox center, Andrew House, with 60 beds.The island had an organic farm, worked on and tilled by homeless clients from the Long Island Shelter, that provided fresh produce for the meals at the city's shelters and programs. A large campus of buildings housed the Long Island Shelter for the homeless in the Tobin Building since 1983, Project S.O.A.R. in the Administration Building since autumn 1995, Pine Street Inn's Anchor Inn, Andrew House (which moved there in 1987 from Dorchester, Massachusetts), the Wyman Community Re-entry Program, Joelyn's Family Home, and others. Volunteers of America had several residences and recovery programs  on the Long Island Health Campus such as Hello House, Casa Isla, and Rebound.

Closure of Long Island services 
On October 8, 2014 at 3 pm, the city of Boston closed the Long Island Viaduct, after an inspection from the Massachusetts Department of Transportation. The bridge was the only access point to Long Island. After the bridge was condemned, hundreds of homeless clients and workers had only three hours to get off the island. The closure of the Long Island Viaduct meant the closure of all homeless shelters and treatment services on the island, leading to the displacement of 700 people and a large migration of homeless people in crisis to the Mass and Cass neighborhood. 57 percent of the city's substance use treatment beds were housed on Long Island.

Immediate interventions in the Mass and Cass neighborhood 
After the closure of Long Island, the Boston Health Care for the Homeless respite facility, Barbara McInnis House, temporarily sheltered four dozen women on cots. 250 men were sheltered for several months on cots and overflow mats at the South End Fitness Center.

Shelter openings at Mass and Cass 
In January 2015, under the Walsh administration, an old Boston transportation building at 112 Southampton St was renovated and turned into a 100-bed men's shelter. In April 2015, it became a 250-bed shelter. In June 2015, the shelter totaled 450 beds.

In 2015, under the Walsh administration, the Woods-Mullen shelter on Massachusetts Avenue was converted into a female-only shelter, increasing its beds for homeless women from 66 to 200 beds.

Opposition to re-opening Long Island 
The city of Quincy has opposed reconstruction of the bridge to Long Island because the only access to the island by bridge is through Quincy. One analysis, done in 2021 during the last months of the Marty Walsh administration, pegged the cost of building restoration at more than $500 million. Mayor Michelle Wu has said a new bridge could cost upwards of $300 million.

Concerns and mayoral responses 
Businesses near Mass and Cass have reported vandalism and difficulty hiring and retaining employees as they fear for their safety. The Greater Boston Food Bank has spent more than $1 million on security since people began camping in the area. The effects of visible homelessness, addiction, mental illness, and desperation on local workers and housed residents, and the city's attempts to deal with growing number of homeless people in the neighborhood, have generated considerable controversy.

Response of the Walsh administration 
In 2019, Mayor Marty Walsh outlined plans to deal with the homelessness situation in the area. Widespread homelessness continued to be a problem when Walsh left office in 2021.

Creation of Boston 311 
In 2015, the city of Boston created a new system for reporting non-emergency issues and accessing city services, called Boston 311. The system can be accessed through several routes, including a phone line, an app, and social media. Boston 311 has a feature where residents can report sightings of discarded syringes. In 2019, the city of Boston reported it removed 14,000 discarded needles from the streets of Boston every week.

Operation Clean Sweep 
On August 1, 2019, a corrections officer was assaulted outside South Bay House of Correction. Some community members stated the assault was in response to the death of Shayne Stilphen, a person experiencing homelessness who died in police custody from an untreated overdose.

In an effort dubbed "Operation Clean Sweep" under the leadership of Mayor Marty Walsh, on August 1 and August 2, 2019, the Boston police department made a series of 34 arrests in the Mass and Cass area. With no notice, police confiscated and destroyed all encampment property, including wheelchairs, by crushing people’s belongings in a garbage truck compressor.

"Operation Clean Sweep", in its two day period, cost the city of Boston around $20,500 in police overtime. "OCS" terrorized homeless residents, who avoided medical and social service providers for months following arrests, out of fear of being abused or incarcerated. "OCS" caused an increase in fatal overdoses, due to the separation of drug-users and providers that respond to and reverse overdoses in the Mass and Cass area. In 2020, the ACLU accused Boston police of intimidation tactics and unlawful detention of pedestrians during "Operation Clean Sweep". The Boston Globe revealed Boston Police Commissioner William Gross praised the arrests in an email. After "OCS", encampments gradually returned to the area.

Modernization of the shelter system 
Walsh's administration redesigned the emergency shelter system to better support people experiencing homelessness in exiting shelters as quickly as possible. Despite his transition in 2021 out of the mayoral role, Walsh's four main interventions still divert people out of the Mass and Cass neighborhood.

 Front Door Triage (FDT) is an immediate response to homeless individuals upon their entry into the homeless system. Front Door Triage was modeled after an emergency room triage system. An 18-month FDT pilot at Boston's four largest adult shelters revealed that individuals enter shelters despite having other viable places to stay. Data found that emergency shelters are an over-utilized safety net for people exiting other systems of care, such as hospitals, jails, and psychiatric facilities. These facilities provide minimal discharge support and often refer clients to shelters with the false expectation that they are fast-tracks to housing. The FDT pilot's findings led to the permanent incorporation of triage departments into Boston shelters. During a guest's first 60 days in a Boston shelter, triage workers assist them with their immediate needs, while assessing for, and diverting to, more appropriate locations to stay. Triage workers assist in family mediation so that clients can return home despite interpersonal conflicts. Workers also provide transportation, connections to inpatient treatment and nursing home care, guidance around tenants' rights, and many other short-term interventions to divert people out of shelters. As of 2018, 18 percent of people who went through triage ended up finding another place to stay immediately.
 Coordinated Access is a centralized online data system that matches homeless individuals to housing vacancies based on need. The Coordinated Access system centralizes vacancies to permanent supportive housing units and uses data to drive outcomes. The system tracks what services sheltered clients are currently utilizing in Boston, so providers can focus on those with unmet needs, and do not duplicate services.
 Rapid rehousing (RRH) is a permanent housing intervention designed to help individuals and families quickly exit homelessness by obtaining, and remaining in, permanent housing. RRH programs use a Housing First approach, focusing on getting people into housing and then addressing barriers once they are in their unit. RRH funds can be flexible, offering short- and medium-term rental subsidies, security and utility deposits, and supportive services to quickly move people into housing. RRH is funded by Massachusetts' Emergency Solutions Grant Program (ESG).
 Permanent Supportive Housing combines subsidized rental housing with individualized support services. Permanent Supportive Housing is an intensive intervention that is typically reserved for individuals with complex barriers who need a high level of support in order to achieve stability in housing.

Response of the Janey administration

Sherriff's proposal to force treatment of individuals 
During Janey’s tenure in September of 2021, Suffolk County Sheriff Steve Tompkins publicized his proposal for Mass and Cass. His plan was to incarcerate people living in tents near Mass and Cass at a former detention center in the South Bay House of Correction, where they would be subjected to involuntarily treatment. In response to the proposal, advocates and attorneys asked Tompkins and other law enforcement agencies to provide more information about the deaths of four prisoners, who all died in a three month span while in the custody of the Suffolk County Sheriff’s Department. One of these people, Ayesha Johnson, died in South Bay House of Correction after being civilly committed to treatment. South Bay House of Correction, also referred to as Suffolk County House of Correction, is a prison located in Mass and Cass on Bradston street right next to the 112 Southampton shelter, the Engagement Center, and two methadone clinics.

At the time of Tompkins' proposal, Massachusetts was facing a lawsuit over using correctional facilities to house men who are civilly committed under Section 35, the state law that allows a judge to involuntarily commit a person to addiction treatment for up to 90 days. In 2016, Massachusetts stopped housing civilly committed women in jails and prisons in response to a lawsuit. Now, women must be sent to inpatient treatment facilities instead of jails and prisons. Men can still be put in correctional facilities when they are involuntarily committed for treatment of substance use disorder. Massachusetts is the only state that allows people civilly committed for substance use disorder to be held in prison.

Executive order to clear encampment 
On October 19, 2021, Acting Mayor Kim Janey announced, in an executive order, that Boston would begin clearing out the encampment in the Mass and Cass neighborhood. Janey cited a lack of hygienic facilities in tents, sexual assaults and crime, and the prevalence of overdose in the area. Advocates objected, stating that the dismantling of the tents and other makeshift structures would be a waste of resources, as well as blatant criminalization of homelessness and addiction.

The 2021 sweeps continued an ongoing local conversation between stakeholders about involuntary treatment. Despite messaging from the city of Boston that expressed a willingness to get homeless people with outstanding warrants into substance use treatment, The Boston Globe found local courts were sending more people from the encampments to jail than to treatment. Suffolk District Attorney, Rachael Rollins, was quoted expressing disappointment at the incarcerations, describing the outcomes as, "having the opposite of what was discussed happen". During the sweeps, a homeless woman was arrested while going to the methadone clinic to get her dose. A homeless man was sent to a jail in Worcester that was experiencing a COVID-19 outbreak. His public defender, and the prosecutor involved in the case, advocated for the man to  be sent to a treatment facility for medically assisted detox, but Judge Paul Treseler ordered him to stay in jail and answer to a warrant for operating under the influence. Joshua Raisler Cohn, the man's attorney, said, "he needed medical care, which is the stated purpose of this court. Instead, he was subjected to a painful and dangerous detox and withdrawal, first while being transported to another county, and then in jail." Most people tried in court following the sweeps had recently sought treatment. One defendant said he had left a treatment center, months before, after a COVID-19 outbreak resulted in the hospitalization of several residents.

Law and health researcher and professor, Leo Beletsky, described the city's advertising of a court-to-treatment pipeline as, "a way of cosmetically improving the situation while also churning very vulnerable people through a very harmful system." Beletsky accused the courts of "catching vulnerable people on technicalities and then using that as a hook to pipe them into the system, kind of like a vacuum for people who are quote, unquote, undesirable or unseemly." Oren Nimni, litigation director at Rights Behind Bars, said, “They’re sending people who might be immunocompromised or might have other medical conditions along with their substance use issues to jails and prisons where there are COVID outbreaks, sentencing people to potential long-term illness or death for a medical issue, substance use.” 

The American Civil Liberties Union of Massachusetts sued to halt the Janey administration's removal of campers from Mass and Cass. The lawsuit demanded that people who were removed should be allowed to return. The suit also sought damages for three plaintiffs whose property was destroyed.

Janey’s response led to the reemergence of the activist group, ACT UP Boston, which organized local labor groups to defend the residents camping at Mass and Cass.

Response of the Wu administration 
As of September 2021, the number of tents in the Mass and Cass area was estimated to have grown from a dozen to more than 100. Mayor Michelle Wu assumed office on November 16, 2021.

Sweep and diversion to low-threshold shelters 
On January 12, 2022, under Wu's leadership, Boston outreach workers, shelter workers, and police officers, began a large sweep of the Mass and Cass encampments as part of a “public health centered approach to encampment resolution”. Campers had a day to remove their belongings under threat of arrest. From January 12 to October 31 of 2022, Boston placed 1,960 people in short-term substance use treatment placements, and sheltered 417 people at six low-threshold sites. The sites are EnVision Hotel, Friends Floor at 112 Southampton (formerly known as Dorm 1), Willows at Woods Mullen Shelter, Pine Street Shelter at Shattuck, Cottage Community at Shattuck, and the Roundhouse.

During the city-sanctioned sweep on Jan. 12, Boston police officers logged just over $17,000 in overtime payments in one day.

Although the sweep successfully transitioned many people into temporary housing, Mass and Cass outreach workers struggled afterwards to locate and serve the estimated hundred people that were displaced from the camps without shelter. Advocates say the number of people in the encampments was undercounted and underestimated, leading to a scarcity of resources, and various crises for those who could no longer camp in the neighborhood. Some people moved from sleeping at Mass and Cass to under bridges, in train tunnels, on sidewalks, and various other locations not meant for habitation. In a WGBH investigation, two people who were displaced from the encampment (one diagnosed with HIV, one diagnosed with lupus and myeloma) said city outreach workers were only able to secure one week in a hotel for them, following the sweeps. After a week, the couple returned to the Mass and Cass neighborhood with no housing options. WBGH identified 12 people who formerly lived in the encampment who had not been offered transitional housing the night of the sweep.

In December 2022, Mayor Wu confirmed 150 people displaced from the sweep were still on the waitlist to get a bed at one of the city-sponsored low-threshold sites.

Collection of syringes 
As of October 2022, the city of Boston collected nearly three times the number of syringes it gave out since January 2022, according to Bisola Ojikutu, executive director of the Boston Public Health Commission.

Affordable housing initiative 
The city of Boston's partnership with shelter provider Pine Street Inn is working to create 500 additional units in five years, beginning in 2022.

On February 16, 2023, Wu announced a major, $67 million investment to create and preserve 802 affordable housing units in the city at a press conference.

Wu made the announcement in front of the Old Blessed Sacrament Church on Centre Street in Jamaica Plain, a now empty church that will be converted into a 55-resident mixed-use mixed-income housing development. She said that development will be one of 17 projects across the city aimed at helping residents "stay and thrive" in Boston.

She said the new affordable housing units will touch eight neighborhoods, including Allston, Chinatown, Dorchester, Jamaica Plain, Mattapan, Mission Hill, Roxbury and South Boston. They will be funded using federal recovery dollars and other money connected to development in the city.

Creation of the Engagement Center (EC)

Tent era 
In 2017, the Boston Public Health Commission opened the Engagement Center, a day center for homeless people, which was originally a 3,200-square-foot domed tent constructed in the parking lot behind the Southampton Street men's shelter. The center was overseen by Devin Larkin, director of the Bureau of Recovery Services. The tent space was open seven days a week and saw 600 clients daily. The EC tent held a small library, a nurse’s station staffed by the Boston Health Care for the Homeless Program, televisions, a phone charging station, a hair-cut station, coffee, water, and snacks. The tent was staffed by 12 employees who engaged clients in activities and conversation, provided case management, facilitated day-to-day operations, and responded to overdoses. The tent was a six-month pilot project with a million dollar budget.

Community reactions 
Some Boston religious leaders called the creation of the EC tent "a band-aid" and "an air-conditioned warehouse". Opposition told WBUR that the funding spent on the EC tent should've been used to increase access to treatment.  DiPierro, who owns a construction company in the Newmarket area, stated he didn't believe the creation of the engagement center tent helped his business at all. DiPierro also opposed the renovation of the Roundhouse into transitional housing. The former hotel is located next to his company.

WBUR spoke with ten people who used the EC tent regularly, all of whom expressed appreciation for its existence. One couple said they stopped panhandling when the EC opened, and commented, "Everybody likes it. Anybody who doesn't hasn't been there." People experiencing homelessness have stated the center has helped them get off their feet, reduced interactions with police around loitering, and improved individuals' quality of life.

Construction of permanent space 
In January 2019, Saam Architecture was hired by the Boston Public Facilities Department to complete plans for a permanent Engagement Center. The design team consulted with Health and Human Services, Recovery Services Bureau, Office of New Urban Mechanics, Inspectional Services, and Homeless Services Bureau. Saam Architecture then developed design requirements for architecture, structure, building systems and a construction cost estimate. Utilizing sustainable construction practices, the company built a 7,000-square-foot, one-story permanent Engagement Center building.

Engagement Center building 
In December 2021, the Engagement Center building opened at 26 Atkinson Street. The EC building offers guests access to restrooms and showers, programming space for art, therapy and wellness services, TV, phone chargers, wifi and books, computer and phone workstations available for email access, applications, and meeting with housing advocates, counselors, recovery coaches, and upgraded nurse’s stations for medical care.

Violence 
In April 2022, Boston police received reports of five stabbings of homeless people near and inside the Engagement Center in a one-week span. None of the stabbing victims had life-threatening symptoms. One perpetrator said he stabbed someone in retaliation to having his drugs stolen. Following the week of violence, the Wu administration shut the EC building down for five days as a "reset".

Outcomes 
Researchers have found that clients that utilize the Engagement Center feel staff really care about them and treat them with respect and dignity, which has helped clients stay engaged in treatment. Dozens of Black and Latinx overdose survivors surveyed in Boston stated that they had encountered some form of discrimination in trying to access city health services. For these and other excluded populations, the engagement center functions as a space to get connected to services and spend time while waiting to get connected to services.

Demographics 
In 2021, Boston Mayor Michelle Wu’s administration released survey data collected from the encampments. The demographics of the Mass and Cass neighborhood reflected that as of December 2021: 

 About 77 tents (sometimes 90), sheltered 143 occupants in the quarter-mile around Mass & Cass.
 There were two main areas of concentration: 39 tents near Atkinson Street, 35 tents near Newmarket Square.
 68% of homeless residents were male, 32% were female.
 1% were 18-24 years old; 21% were 25-34; 49% were 35-44; 28% were 45+; average age: 40.
 39% were Hispanic/Latino, 36% were white, 19% were Black, 6% were multiracial; 14% spoke Spanish as their primary language.
 Around 24% came from outside of Boston.
 49% lacked a health care provider.
 18% had been released from a house of correction in the previous 2 years.
 59% had been living in a tent for under 2 years, 17% had for over 6 years.
 23% used medication to treat opioid use disorder. Of those, 57% used methadone, 38% used Suboxone, 5% used long-acting Suboxone.
 87% used cocaine or crack cocaine, 76% used opiates, 20% methamphetamines.
 78% didn't have access to a mental health care provider, but a majority wanted access to one.
 95% wanted access to low-threshold housing, 34% wanted an emergency shelter, 20% wanted a treatment bed.
These demographics change year-to-year based on a number of factors, such as, how policies respond to drug use and sex work, which groups are prioritized in affordable housing placements, how much the cost of rent has increased, how many affordable housing units have been added,  and other factors. Population demographics also change as a result of shifts in the drug supply (such as, shortages, contaminations) and how have these shifts impact people that use drugs (through disability,  community, and deaths).

Neighborhood services

Access, Harm Reduction, Overdose Prevention and Education (AHOPE) 
AHOPE is a harm reduction program based out of BPHC's Recovery Services Bureau at 774 Massachusetts Ave in Boston. AHOPE has a drug checking service using fentanyl test strips and two mobile spectrometers, which helps providers and drug-users better understand the makeup of drugs on the street and create an early warning system for hazards in drugs. AHOPE has been a leader in alerting people of the prevalence of xylazine in the drug supply in 2022 and 2023. Xylazine contamination in popular street drugs has led to major soft tissue infections and long periods of sedation in people who use drugs. AHOPE offers HIV, Hepatitis, and STI testing, a legal needle exchange, supported referrals to HIV, Hepatitis, and STI treatment, overdose prevention education and training, risk reduction counseling, and risk reduction supplies to reduce the spread of HIV and Hepatitis C infection.

Boston Comprehensive Treatment Center (Boston CTC) 
Boston CTC is an outpatient methadone treatment facility that provides medication-assisted treatment for people with opioid use disorder.

Boston Health Care for the Homeless Program (BHCHP) 

BHCHP is the nation’s largest freestanding health care nonprofit for homeless people, with its headquarters at 780 Albany Street in the Jean Yawkey Place (JYP) building. Within JYP is Barbara McInnis House, the first respite center for homeless people in the United States. The facility keeps approximately 2,200 patients a year off the street and out of congregate settings while they recover from serious illness. McInnis House also provides dignified end-of-life care for undocumented, terminally ill, homeless people. Beyond McInnis House, the Jean Yawkey Place building offers homeless and formerly-homeless patients medical case management, office-based addiction treatment (OBAT), dental care, behavioral health care, primary care, supportive place for observation and treatment (SPOT), and many other medical services. BHCHP has in-house clinics in several Mass and Cass buildings, including the 112 Southampton Street shelter, the Woods Mullen shelter, AHOPE in the Finland Building, and the Engagement Center.

Faster Paths to Treatment 
Faster Paths is Boston Medical Center's substance use disorder urgent care program. Faster Paths refers patients with substance use disorders to a network of care, including inpatient and outpatient detox, treatment, and aftercare services.

Health Care Resource Centers Boston (HCRC Boston) 
HCRC Boston is an outpatient methadone treatment facility that provides medication-assisted treatment for people with opioid use disorder. HCRC Boston works with Project RESPECT of Boston Medical Center to give care to new and expecting mothers, and with South Bay House of Correction to treat incarcerated pregnant and postpartum women.

Project Teaching, Referral, Understanding, Support, and Testing (Project TRUST) 
Project TRUST is a drop-in center run by a team of community health workers who utilize peer mentoring to help clients access addiction treatment resources, harm reduction education and supplies, and navigation of medical services including primary care and urgent care services. Project TRUST is part of Boston Medical Center. The center was founded in 1988 to respond to the first wave of HIV among people who in inject drugs in Boston.

Providing Access to Addictions Treatment, Hope and Support (PAATHS) 
PAATHS is a substance use program based out of BPHC's Recovery Services Bureau at 774 Massachusetts Ave. PAATHS connects a thousand people a month to detox, CSS/TSS programs, medication assisted treatment, and outpatient treatment programs.

Rosie’s Place 
Founded as the first women’s shelter in America, Rosie’s Place provides homeless women with basic emergency support services, alongside ESOL classes, legal help, advocacy, governance, art therapy, employment and training, and housing stabilization services.

Roundhouse Clinical Services 
Roundhouse Clinical Services consists of two medical programs run by Boston Medical Center in the basement of the former Best Western Roundhouse building. The services include a Stabilization Care Center (SCC) with an observation and stabilization unit where patients can stay for up to 24 hours for management of withdrawal, over-intoxication, or substance-related symptoms (agitation, psychosis). The facility has 20 recliner chairs and is staffed by doctors, nurses, and harm-reduction specialists. Roundhouse also has a Transitional Care Center (TCC), an addiction-focused urgent care clinic with two exam rooms, staffed by a nurse and a doctor. Roundhouse Clinical Services are offered in the same building as the low-threshold transitional housing facility where 31 people displaced by the January 2022 sweeps stay at a time. Roundhouse Clinical Services were created to reduce the strain addiction-related crises were putting on local emergency departments.

In February 2023, Boston Medical Center announced it would be ending Roundhouse Clinical Services by March 31 due to a lack of funding. Transitional housing services will continue until June 2023. New England Users Union stated the closure of Roundhouse services will negatively impact people experiencing homelessness and people who use drugs. Some businesses oppose the closure, fearing untreated, unsupervised, erratic symptoms of drug use will put workers and customers in danger again. Other local business owners support the closure, believing it will reduce crime. Doctors and public health workers have warned the closure will lead to more people living on the street, more public drug use, and more overdose deaths.

In March 2023, Massachusetts announced that it would provide temporary funding for clinical services at the Roundhouse Hotel through July 2023.

Solomon Carter Fuller Mental Health Center (The Fuller) 
The Solomon Fuller Mental Health Center is an inpatient psychiatric facility with 60 beds. The Fuller is part of the Boston Medical Center and is operated by the Massachusetts Department of Mental Health. The facility was named after Dr. Solomon Carter Fuller, an African-American psychiatrist and professor at Boston University School of Medicine.

Southampton Street Shelter 
Southampton Street Shelter (also known as "112") is a 24 hour, year-round shelter that provides homeless men with a bed, linens, showers, and three meals a day. The shelter also provides primary care, behavioral health services, mail, and limited housing assistance to priority populations in Boston.

Victory Connector 
The Victory Connector is a low-threshold navigation center serving women and transgender individuals with support groups, educational workshops, HIV/STI and pregnancy testing, harm reduction counseling and supplies, and a safe place to relax indoors for the day. The program is run out of Victory Programs.

Victory Programs Mobile Prevention Team (MPT) 
MPT is a team of community health workers who provide people living on the street with naloxone rescue kits, sterile syringes in a variety of sizes and gauges, condoms and lube, safer injection kits, safer smoking kits, wound care kits, and fentanyl test strips. MPT also does Hep-C, Narcan, and PreP education and training at various sites in the community, including methadone clinics.

Woods Mullen Shelter 
Woods Mullen is a 24 hour, year-round shelter that provides homeless women with a bed, linens, showers, and three meals a day. The shelter also provides primary care, behavioral health services, mail, and limited housing assistance to priority populations in Boston.

Police presence

Overtime spending 
Boston police officers collected nearly $4 million in overtime pay between 2019 and 2020 for work at Massachusetts Avenue and Melnea Cass Boulevard. All the Mass. and Cass overtime hours in 2019 and 2020 were listed in city payroll reports under a “special events” category, which is also used to track the number of police hours worked during the Boston Marathon, the St. Patrick’s Day parade in Southie, Red Sox games and Fourth of July details.

The 2019/2020 overtime report has drawn criticism from homeless advocates, mental health professionals, and public policy experts, who believe the money could've been spent on expanding overburdened services, building more low-threshold housing, and raising the salaries of low-paid outreach workers in the area.

Newmarket Business Association president, Sue Sullivan, was surprised by the number. Sullivan expressed that though she's seen some officers intervene, she finds most sit in their cars and seem hesitant to engage with the homeless residents of Mass and Cass. In the summer of 2022, the Newmarket Business Association paid a private security company “between $500,000 and $1 million” to respond to situations in the neighborhood, because they found police often take over 45 minutes to respond. Police union president Larry Calderone confirmed this response time, stating that police tend to be completely exhausted when they work overtime shifts.

In the first 10 months of Mayor Michelle Wu’s tenure, up through August 2022, Boston police logged more than $4 million in overtime payments in the area, according to police payroll records. Between 2021 and August 2022, the city spent around $8 million on police overtime, payroll data show — nearly double the $4.3 million spent in the previous two years combined. Police overtime accounted for around half of the 2022 budget for city spending on all services at Mass. and Cass, excluding state and federal grants, according to a budget breakdown provided by the city. For overtime shifts, officers made 1.5 times their standard hourly rate at an average of $66 per hour, depending on rank and seniority. Some officers make as much as $86 per hour, according to the union’s contract with the city.

Lack of intervention in violence 
People living at Mass and Cass have stated repeatedly that uniformed police officers do not react or intervene when violent assaults occur against members of the homeless community there.

A homeless individual was quoted by WGBH commenting on Mass and Cass police saying, "What they’re doing is literally ... nothing. They just sit in their cars. They’re the ones who should be getting arrested for robbery."

Massachusetts’ primary election debate 
In a 2022 debate leading up to the elections of Senate 2nd Suffolk District, Suffolk County sheriff and Suffolk County district attorney hosted by grassroots political organization Boston’s Communities of Color, candidates debated how police, prisons and incarceration should impact the Mass and Cass neighborhood.

Suffolk County District Attorney Kevin Hayden argued for more investment in programs to assist people arrested on non-violent charges, while holding predators accountable. Hayden’s office has allocated $400,000 in funds seized from drug-related convictions toward Services Over Sentences, a program created to provide an alternative to prosecution for those convicted of “low-level offenses” at Mass. and Cass.

Boston City Councilor Ricardo Arroyo mentioned a 2016 study from the Massachusetts Department of Health that found that people who receive involuntary treatment are 2.2 times more likely to die of opioid-related overdoses than people who voluntarily seek treatment. Arroyo cited the study to argue against involuntarily hospitalization and incarceration of people using drugs in the neighborhood . Arroyo is in favor of the reallocation of funds spent on policing into community-based services and public health resources. He's spoken on several occasions about how the money spent in overtime fraud in the Boston Police Department could've been used to treat and rehabilitate many homeless residents.

Risks of excessive police presence 
In 2019, Aubri Esters pressed Mayor Marty Walsh to reduce the number of police officers at Mass and Cass. Esters provided insight as a person with lived experience, warning that police harassment of homeless people resting at Mass and Cass encouraged homeless people to use methamphetamine as a means to remain awake, which inadvertently caused symptoms of meth use in irratic and violent behavior. Esters educated stakeholders about how police surveillance pushes people to hastily inject drugs, to avoid being detained for carrying illegal substances, leading to overdose and other health hazards.

Road hazards

Design 
The Newmarket Industrial District is home to one of the largest intersections in Boston, with over eight entryways and exits, twenty-eight vehicle traffic lanes, and multiple lanes for bikers. Mass Ave and Melnea Cass have hard-to-read street markings. There is no pedestrian crosswalk on the south side of Melnea Cass, which is right off of Interstate 93 and the Mass Pike.

Crash data 
In 2019, based on EMS responses and fatality data from Boston Police, the Boston Transportation Department compiled and published data of city-owned streets that had the highest density of pedestrian crashes between 2015-2017. Four streets in the Mass and Cass neighborhood were identified as being in the top 3% of crashes in the city of Boston. Those streets were Melnea Cass Blvd, Southampton St, Albany Street, and Massachusetts Ave, with a total of three pedestrian fatalities, and dozens of pedestrian injuries over the three year period.

Pedestrian fatalities 
On August 24, 2016, around 5:17 a.m., a pedestrian was killed in a hit and run near the Solomon Carter Fuller Mental Health Center.

On December 8, 2016, around 10:30 p.m., a pedestrian was struck and killed by an MBTA bus on Theodore Glynn Way.

On June 24, 2019, at 7:48 am, a woman was hit by a car and killed crossing the intersection at the corner of Mass Ave and Melnea Cass Boulevard.

On January 8, 2020, at 8:40 pm, a man suffered and died from life-threatening injuries after being hit by a car on Melnea Cass Boulevard.

On March 16, 2020, at 2:55 pm, a 66-year-old man suffered and died from life-threatening injuries after being hit by a car at the intersection of Albany Street and Massachusetts Avenue.

On April 22, 2020, at 9:10 am, a person was walking their bike through the intersection of Massachusetts and Harrison avenues when they were hit and killed by a flat bed truck.

On September 29, 2020, at 10:30 am, a woman died after being hit by a truck while standing on the median at the intersection of Dorchester Avenue and Southampton Street.

On October 16, 2021, at 10:26 am, a car whipped around Theodore Glynn Way in Roxbury and crashed into three people who were walking on the side of the road, injuring two of them and killing 59-year old homeless woman, Lisa Vadeboncoeur.

On October 22, 2022 at 9:40 pm, Mark McAuliffe, a 49-year-old homeless man attempted to cross the I-93 highway, when a Toyota SUV struck him, which threw him over the median onto the southbound highway where he was struck again, and was pronounced dead.

On January 20, 2023 at 10:45 pm, Michael E. Simpson, a Black 73-year-old homeless man tried to cross the intersection of Melnea Cass Boulevard and Massachussetts Ave. Simpson was hit by an SUV and dragged, screaming underneath the car, for several blocks until he died.

In popular culture 
The Mass and Cass neighborhood was referenced by the character, Fergus “Fergie” Colm, in The Town (2010 film) as being the location where Doug MacRay's mother took her own life while under the influence of drugs.

The character, Steve, in The Haunting of Hill House, goes to look for his brother, Luke, at Mass and Cass in the show’s 8th episode, Witness Marks. Luke’s character struggles with addiction in the show. Steve refers to the neighborhood as its widely-used nicknames “methadone mile” and “open air drug market”. The show’s creator, Mike Flanagan, is from Massachusetts and is in recovery from a substance use disorder.

Further reading 
Community Care in Reach: Mobilizing Harm Reduction and Addiction Treatment Services for Vulnerable Populations

Finding community on the street

Naming the sites of the opioid crisis in Boston: a political issue

Racial Disparities in Opioid Overdose Deaths in Massachusetts

Substance Use and Mental Health Effects of Disrupting Treatment and Shelter Services on Boston Harbor's Long Island

References

Homelessness in the United States
Streets in Boston
Neighborhoods in Boston
Skid rows
Opioid epidemic
Addiction medicine
Drug culture
Drug paraphernalia
Drug safety
Harm reduction
Medical hygiene
Medical prevention
Medical waste
Prevention of HIV/AIDS
United States federal policy
Public services of the United States
Addiction organizations in the United States
Drug policy of the United States
Drug policy organizations based in the United States
Drug-related deaths in the United States
Early warning systems
Organizations based in Massachusetts
Public health
Public health organizations
Vulnerable adults
Substance intoxication
Substance abuse
Substance abuse counselors
Civil liberties advocacy groups in the United States
Human rights organizations based in the United States
Political advocacy groups in the United States
Social justice organizations
Crime in Massachusetts
History of Boston
Sexuality in Massachusetts